The 33rd Legislative Assembly of British Columbia sat from 1983 to 1986. The members were elected in the British Columbia general election held in May 1983. The Social Credit Party led by Bill Bennett formed the government. After Bennett retired in 1986, Bill Vander Zalm became Premier. The New Democratic Party (NDP) led by Dave Barrett formed the official opposition. After Barrett resigned his seat in 1984, Bob Skelly became party leader.

Kenneth Walter Davidson served as speaker for the assembly.

Members of the 33rd Parliament
The following members were elected to the assembly in 1983:

Notes:

Party standings

By-elections 
By-elections were held to replace members for various reasons:

Notes:

Other changes 
Graham Lea becomes an Independent on June 20, 1984, and on February 8, 1985, he forms the United Party. He dissolves the United Party to join the Progressive Conservatives on March 26, 1986.
Al Passarell joins Social Credit on October 22, 1985.
South Peace River (res. Donald McGray Phillips April 28, 1986.)
Yale-Lillooet (res. Thomas Manville Waterland August 5, 1986.)
Langley (res. Robert Howard McClelland August 7, 1986.)

References 

Political history of British Columbia
Terms of British Columbia Parliaments
1983 establishments in British Columbia
1986 disestablishments in British Columbia
20th century in British Columbia